The Great Western Railway 3200 Class (or 'Earl' Class) was a design of 4-4-0 steam locomotive for passenger train work. The nickname for this class, almost universally used at the time these engines were in service was Dukedog since the locomotives were composed of former Duke Class boilers on Bulldog Class frames. As such they were one of the last standard gauge steam locomotive classes to retain outside frames.

Background
The GWR absorbed the Cambrian Railways in 1923, but, with the Cambrian main line being lightly built, permanent way restrictions debarred the use of heavier locomotives. This meant that only a few classes of GWR locomotive were allowed to run over it, including the Duke Class. However, by the 1930s the Duke class engines were past their estimated life, and in particular the frames were in poor condition. At the same time the heavier Bulldog Class was becoming redundant and being withdrawn, and later members of this class had an improved straight topped frame design.

Construction
In December 1929, Duke No.3265 Tre Pol and Pen was withdrawn, and the cab and other above-frame fittings together with a spare Duke boiler and smokebox, were fitted to the straight-topped frames of Bulldog no. 3365 Charles Grey Mott. The rebuilt locomotive was given the name and number of the Duke. This resulted in an engine with stronger frames which could still be used on yellow weight restricted routes.

The conversion was a success and from 1936 twenty-nine "new" locomotives were constructed from the relevant components of withdrawn Dukes and Bulldogs. The classification of the rebuilds as "new" locomotives had advantages in the railway's accounts, and they were given new numbers in the 32xx series (3200–3228). A further eleven conversions were scheduled, but the onset of World War II brought a halt to the program.

Naming
The prototype conversion retained its Duke number and name (3265 Tre Pol and Pen). The first nominally new locomotive was numbered 3201, and originally kept the name of the parent Duke. A decision was then taken to name the class after living Earls who had some connection with the GWR. Apparently, as a riposte to repeated requests from aristocratic GWR directors for engines to be named after them, the CME of Great Western, Charles Collett decided that these "new" engines, with their decidedly old-fashioned Victorian appearance, should be given the names of those directors. When the directors assembled at Paddington Station for the unveiling of the "new" class, the group were not impressed at Collett's joke. So, although the first batch of twenty were allocated Earl names, following the construction and naming of no. 3212 Earl of Eldon in May 1937, the nameplates were removed and the names given to nos. 5043–5062 of the express Castle class instead.

Renumbering
In the 1946 renumbering all the surviving locomotives in the 32xx series, both Dukes and Dukedogs, were renumbered in the 90xx series, retaining the same last two digits. This was to free the 32xx numbers for new 2251 Class engines.

Operations

Mainly allocated to the Cambrian main line, it remained one of the few classes of locomotive that British Rail inherited that were light enough to be permitted on the wooden Barmouth Bridge (others were the GWR 2251 Class and the LMS Ivatt Class 2 2-6-0). As a result, they remained in regular use until the 1950s.

Preservation: 9017 Earl of Berkeley 

One locomotive, 9017 Earl of Berkeley survives in preservation at the Bluebell Railway. The locomotive was built at Swindon Works in 1938, using frames from "Bulldog" No. 3425 (built 1906), and boiler and cab from "Duke" class No. 3282 (originally named "Chepstow Castle", built in 1895). Originally numbered 3217, it was renumbered post-WW2 as 9017. Mainly deployed on the Cambrian Line, the locomotive was withdrawn from service at Oswestry in October 1960.

Preserved privately directly from British Railways, with the Bluebell Line as the then only preserved standard-gauge line in the whole of the UK, it arrived there 15 February 1962. From September 1963 it carried the name plates from GWR 4073 Class No. 5060. It carried its post-WW2 9017 plates until the BR withdrawal of GWR 0-6-0 No.3217, when it was reunited with its original number plates in early 1965. After a period out of traffic from December 1973, its overhaul began in 1980, returning to traffic in 1982. After its last overhaul completed in November 2003, its private owner donated it to the Bluebell Railway, on condition that it remained mainly in service on the line. After a series of boiler and mechanical failures in June 2011, it is currently awaiting overhaul and is in storage at Horsted Keynes Carriage and Wagon Workshop.

Numbering
NB: In the table below, names in parentheses were allocated but never actually carried in GWR/BR service.

References

Bibliography

External links 

 Great Western Archive

3200
4-4-0 locomotives
Railway locomotives introduced in 1936
Standard gauge steam locomotives of Great Britain
Rebuilt locomotives
Passenger locomotives